Delwyn Orin Gage (born November 28, 1930) is an American politician, accountant, and businessman who served in the Montana Senate from 1982 to 1998, representing the 5th legislative district of Montana as a Republican. He served as Senate Majority Leader from 1989 to 1991.

Early life and education
Gage was born in Calvin, North Dakota on November 28, 1930. He attended Brigham Young University.

Career
Gage served in the Korean War as a member of the United States Marine Corps.

Gage served in the Montana Senate from 1982 to 1998, representing the 5th legislative district of Montana as a Republican. He served as Senate Majority Leader from 1989 to 1991.

Gage ran unopposed in the 1990 Montana Senate elections.

Outside of politics, Gage worked as an accountant and businessman.

Political positions
Gage received an 88% from the National Federation of Independent Business in 1996.

Personal life
Gage currently resides in Bigfork, Montana. He previously resided in Cut Bank, Montana.

Gage is married to Sarah Marlene Brenchley.

Electoral history

Notes

References

External links
Profile from Vote Smart

1930 births
Living people
20th-century American politicians
Republican Party Montana state senators
Businesspeople from Montana
United States Marines
Military personnel from Montana
Brigham Young University alumni
People from Bigfork, Montana
People from Cut Bank, Montana
People from Cavalier County, North Dakota